Alan Igbon (29 May 1952 – 9 December 2020) was a British actor, best known for his roles in television series such as The Professionals, Coronation Street and Boys from the Blackstuff.

Life and career 
Igbon was born in Hulme, Manchester, in May 1952. His father was Nigerian and his mother was Irish.

Igbon took the background part of inmate Meakin in the cinematic re-make of the controversial borstal TV film Scum (1979), whose character launched an emotional tirade against senior members of staff after the suicide of another convict. The cast included Ray Winstone and Patrick Murray.

Igbon appeared as Angadi, part of a kidnapping gang in the LWT drama The Professionals; episode The Acorn Syndrome (1980). Igbon starred as Loggo in Boys from the Blackstuff, a BBC television drama about a group of unemployed men in Liverpool during the recession-ravaged early 1980s, written by Alan Bleasdale. He also took a leading role in the sitcom The Front Line, playing the dreadlocked Sheldon, alongside Paul Barber as his police officer brother Malcolm, and had a role in the film Water (1985).

Other staple programmes in which Igbon featured include Bleasdale's drama G.B.H., medical serial Doctors and Channel 4 soap opera Brookside. He had a supporting role in the third series of Auf Wiedersehen, Pet as a bodyguard and stooge to the programme's main villain (played by Boys from the Blackstuff co-star Michael Angelis) and then took a temporary role in ITV soap Coronation Street, playing Tony Stewart the estranged father of regular character Jason Grimshaw.

Death 
Igbon died on 9 December 2020, at the age of 68.

Filmography

Film

Television

References

External links
 

1952 births
2020 deaths
Black British male actors
English male film actors
English male television actors
Male actors from Manchester
People from Hulme
English people of Nigerian descent
English people of Irish descent
20th-century English male actors